The 2010 Florida Tuskers season was the second and final season for the Virginia Destroyers as the Florida Tuskers. They finished with a 5–3 regular season record and lost in the 2010 UFL Championship Game to the Las Vegas Locomotives for a second straight season.

Offseason
Head coach Jim Haslett left the team in January 2010, becoming the new defensive coordinator for the Washington Redskins. On February 9, 2010, Jay Gruden was named the team's new head coach and general manager by UFL commissioner Michael Huyghue. On the same day of Gruden's appointment, the Tampa Bay Rays were announced to have sold their interest in the franchise, which meant that all home games for the Tuskers would be played at the Citrus Bowl in Orlando.

Along with the league's other teams, the Tuskers unveiled new uniforms during an event at Fashion Show Mall in Las Vegas on July 28, 2010.

UFL draft

Personnel

Staff

Roster

Schedule

Championship game

Standings

Game summaries

Week 1: at Las Vegas Locomotives

Week 2: at Sacramento Mountain Lions

Week 3: vs. Las Vegas Locomotives

Week 4: at Hartford Colonials

Week 5: BYE

Week 6: vs. Sacramento Mountain Lions

Week 7: BYE

Week 8: vs. Omaha Nighthawks

Week 9: vs. Hartford Colonials

Week 10: at Omaha Nighthawks

Championship game

References

Florida Tuskers Season, 2010
Florida Tuskers seasons
Florida Tuskers